This is a list of flag bearers who have represented Turkmenistan at the Olympics.

Flag bearers carry the national flag of their country at the opening ceremony of the Olympic Games.

See also
Turkmenistan at the Olympics

References

Turkmenistan at the Olympics
Turkmenistan
Olympic flagbearers
Olympics